Ha Lejone is a village in the Leribe District of northern Lesotho.

It is also the northern extent of the high water backed up by the Katse Dam,  to the south. There is a bridge across the river just south of the village.

References

Fitzpatrick, M., Blond, B., Pitcher, G., Richmond, S., and Warren, M. (2004) South Africa, Lesotho and Swaziland. Footscray, VIC: Lonely Planet.

Populated places in Leribe District